Bringin' It Down is an LP released by the New York hardcore band Judge. It was released on Revelation Records in 1989. The original recording of the album was released under the title Chung King Can Suck It (with two additional tracks that did not make it onto Bringin' It Down). This recording, which had been made at Chung King Studios, was rejected by the band after thousands of dollars had been spent on it. Since there had been substantial pre-orders of Bringin' It Down the label printed 110 copies of the rejected recording under its alternate title, to satisfy demand until the band could re-record it at a different studio. The popularity of Judge in the hardcore straight edge scene, and the severely limited release, has made Chung King Can Suck It likely the most sought after and expensive hardcore record ever (though Revelation Records never profited from it). Copies, when they are sold, sell for over a thousand dollars.

Track listing 

"Take Me Away"
"Bringin' It Down"
"Hold Me Back"
"Give It Up"
"The Storm"
"Hear Me"
"Like You"
"I've Lost"
"Where It Went"

See also 
Chung King Can Suck It
What It Meant: The Complete Discography

External links 
Revelation Records page on Bringin' It Down
Revelation Records pressing info for Bringin' It Down
Bringin' It Down comprehensive pressing information

1989 albums
Judge (band) albums
Revelation Records albums
Albums produced by Don Fury
Albums recorded at Chung King Studios